AS Monaco won Division 1 season 1960/1961 of the French Association Football League with 57 points.

Participating teams

 Angers SCO
 FC Grenoble
 Le Havre AC
 RC Lens
 Limoges FC
 Olympique Lyonnais
 AS Monaco
 FC Nancy
 OGC Nice
 Nîmes Olympique
 RC Paris
 Stade de Reims
 Stade Rennais UC
 FC Rouen
 AS Saint-Etienne
 UA Sedan-Torcy
 Stade Français FC
 Toulouse FC
 AS Troyes-Savinienne
 US Valenciennes-Anzin

Final table

Promoted from Division 2, who will play in Division 1 season 1961/1962
 SO Montpellier:Champion of Division 2
 FC Metz:runner-up of Division 2
 FC Sochaux-Montbéliard: Third place
 RC Strasbourg: Fourth place, Inter-Cities Fairs Cup

Results

Top goalscorers

References
 Division 1 season 1960-1961 at pari-et-gagne.com

Ligue 1 seasons
French
1